Anil Nautiyal is an Indian politician and member of the Bharatiya Janata Party. Nautiyal was a member of the Uttarakhand Legislative Assembly from the Karnaprayag constituency in Chamoli District.

Anil Nautiyal won 2022 Uttarakhand Legislative Assembly election by 6715 votes. He defeated Mukesh Negi of Indian National Congress.

References 

People from Uttarkashi district
Bharatiya Janata Party politicians from Uttarakhand
Uttarakhand MLAs 2022–2027
Living people
21st-century Indian politicians
1958 births